Minenko or Mynenko is a gender-neutral Ukrainian surname. Notable people with the surname include:

Hanna Knyazyeva-Minenko (born 1989), Israeli triple jumper and long jumper
Mark Minenko (born 1957), Canadian politician

See also
 

Ukrainian-language surnames